"Last Gasp" is the fourth episode of the first series of British dark comedy anthology television programme Inside No.9. It first aired on 26 February 2014 on BBC Two. The story revolves around the ninth birthday of the severely ill Tamsin (Lucy Hutchinson). Tamsin's parents Jan (Sophie Thompson) and Graham (Steve Pemberton) have arranged with charity WishmakerUK for singer Frankie J Parsons (David Bedella) to visit as a treat for their daughter. Frankie dies after blowing up a balloon, leading to arguments between Graham, WishmakerUK representative Sally (Tamsin Greig) and Frankie's assistant Si (Adam Deacon) over the now-valuable balloon containing Frankie's last breath. The story, written by Pemberton and Reece Shearsmith, was inspired by someone Pemberton had seen on television who collected air from different places. The episode is more comedic than others in the series, and critiques celebrity culture and human greed.

"Last Gasp" received a fairly negative critical response; in retrospect, Pemberton claimed that "people hated" the episode. Several critics, including Gerard Gilbert of The Independent, Jack Seale of Radio Times and comedy critic Bruce Dessau—though complimentary of Inside No.9 generally—considered "Last Gasp" to be weaker than the previous three episodes, but not unwatchable. Other reviewers gave a more positive response, but a particularly scathing review by columnist Virginia Blackburn was published in the Daily Express. On its first showing, "Last Gasp" drew 872,000 viewers, lower than any previous episode. Pemberton subsequently sold a balloon containing his own breath on eBay, with proceeds going to a Sport Relief charity.

Production
"Last Gasp" was inspired by someone Pemberton had seen on children's programme Multi-Coloured Swap Shop who collected apparently empty jars which actually contained air taken from different places. The idea, which he considered "bizarre" but "very special", had "haunted" him. This gave him the idea of collecting the breath of celebrities. The death of Michael Jackson and the death of Amy Winehouse, along with the associated collecting of memorabilia, also served as inspiration. For Pemberton, the family and house in "Last Gasp" were very "normal". The episode was filmed on location in what director David Kerr called an "utterly freezing" house. The finished episode, for Kerr, had a degree of "suburban darkness" in that, though the events unfold in a relatively unremarkable setting, the darker side of human nature is revealed. At the same time, the characters' arguments lead to humour. Shearsmith described "Last Gasp" as like a My Family episode "gone wrong".

As the format of Inside No. 9 requires new characters each week, the writers were able to attract actors who may have been unwilling to commit to an entire series. In addition to Pemberton—who played Graham, the father—"Last Gasp" starred Sophie Thompson as Jan, the mother; Lucy Hutchinson as 9-year-old Tamsin; David Bedella as popstar Frankie J Parsons; Tamsin Greig as Sally, of WishmakerUK; and Adam Deacon as Si, Parsons's assistant. It is, so far, the only episode of the programme not to star Shearsmith. For Kerr, the typical difficulty associated with the use of child actors was not present in "Last Gasp"; for him, Hutchinson "was superb. She was brilliant; she had maturity beyond her years." Pemberton and Shearsmith had been keen to use Inside No.9 as a vehicle to work with new people, and had been keen to collaborate with Greig for some time. Kerr said that "one of the real joys of Inside No.9" was the opportunity to see actors in very different roles to those in which they had previously starred. He used Greig as his example, saying the character of Sally was somewhat different from the roles in which Greig had previously performed.

Plot

On the ninth birthday of the severely ill Tamsin, parents Graham and Jan struggle with a camcorder and blow up balloons. A charity called WishmakerUK has arranged for pop star Frankie J Parsons to visit Tamsin. Frankie arrives, much to the excitement of Jan, accompanied by his personal assistant Si and WishmakerUK representative Sally. Frankie visits Tamsin in her bedroom, and blows up a purple balloon for her. He begins to struggle for breath and then collapses from an intracranial aneurysm. Later, Graham makes tea for Jan and Sally. Jan is upset about Frankie's death. Si says that no one can touch anything or call an ambulance until Frankie's manager arrives. Tamsin, sitting in her wheelchair, holds the balloon; and Graham and Si realise that it may be valuable. Si takes the balloon from Tamsin, and Graham ties it. Sally takes a call from her boss, but does not mention Frankie's death. She makes excuses to have a colleague cover for her on her next assignment so that she can stay at the house. Graham and Si argue over the balloon, and Graham gives it to Sally, as he considers her "a neutral". He looks online to work out how much the balloon and accompanying footage may be worth.

Later, Jan starts playing one of Frankie's CDs, but Graham turns it off to talk about money with Si and Sally. Jan takes Tamsin outside. Tamsin worries that Frankie's death is her fault because she asked him to blow up the balloon. She asks if Frankie's soul will go to Heaven, and Jan says that it will. Inside, Si, Sally and Graham argue about how to split the money they will make from the balloon. The argument gets heated after Sally argues that the fact Tamsin will soon die should preclude her from getting a share. As Graham threatens to pop the balloon, Jan reappears and chastises him. Tamsin, who is now considered neutral, takes the balloon. Graham says they should all settle down and have lunch. In the kitchen, Sally and Jan talk about Sally's work, and, in Tamsin's bedroom, Graham and Si talk about Parsons, with Si revealing that Parsons was actually unpleasant to work for. There is a loud bang from outside, and everyone goes back into the lounge, erroneously thinking that the balloon has burst. Graham and Si take the balloon to an upstairs bedroom and tuck it into a bed, while Jan turns the music back on.

Everyone sits in silence, waiting for Parsons's manager to arrive. Jan suggests that Graham blow up another balloon for Tamsin. Sally, Si and Graham realise that, with the camera footage they have, they can blow up all the purple balloons and sell them to multiple bidders. Jan screams when she sees movement in Tamsin's bedroom, and it is realised that Frankie is still alive. Jan takes Tamsin out of the room and the remaining three agree, after panicked discussion, that they should kill Frankie. Si loses a coin toss and smothers Frankie with a cushion. Later, out on the street, Frankie's body is put into an ambulance. Si says to Sally and Graham that he will be in touch and leaves. Sally and Graham discuss selling the camcorder footage, and Jan runs inside to see that Tamsin is not in her chair or room. Upstairs, Tamsin crawls onto the bed containing the balloon, carrying a heart-shaped helium balloon. On the street, Sally, Graham and Jan see Tamsin opening the upstairs window. She releases the helium balloon with the balloon containing Frankie's breath attached. The two float skyward as Graham films.

Themes and analysis

Comedy critic Bruce Dessau described the episode as containing "a nice if not very subtle critique" of the value of celebrity, and noted that there was "a flicker" of "The Pardoner's Tale", a story from writer Geoffrey Chaucer's collection The Canterbury Tales. Rebecca McQuillan, writing in The Herald, felt the episode captures the "sheer unctuousness" of fandom. She added that, as the plot advances, the venal and vulgar attitudes which are initially hidden behind the characters' fake grins are revealed. For her, the story takes place around Tamsin, who looks "worldly and disappointed with the human race". David Chater, of The Times, identified celebrity worship and greed as the episode's themes.

In South African newspaper The Star, the episode was identified as the most cynical of the first series. For the reviewer, it "parades before us the depravity to which the human animal will stoop, and explores how agendas can be furthered under the noble cover of altruism". David Upton, writing for PopMatters, called it "easily the most acerbic and most overtly comic" episode of the series. He listed three reasons that the episode does not seem like something produced by Pemberton and Shearsmith: its avoidance of the horrific; the fact that it does not star Shearsmith; and its direct focus on celebrity culture, which Upton considers a modern phenomenon. Instead, he suggested that it feels closer to a story from Charlie Brooker's anthology programme Black Mirror. The focus of "Last Gasp" on comedy to the exclusion of horror, for Upton, leaves it "stranded" when compared to the other episodes.

Some critics questioned the plausibility of the premise. Daily Express columnist Virginia Blackburn felt that there was potential for a comedic critique of the celebrity memorabilia market. Such a story, she suggested, would be based around selling the balloon—not the breath—something she felt may have happened. Paddy Shennan, writing for the Liverpool Echo, questioned the extent to which the ending would actually impact the characters, asking whether they could have nonetheless sold the fake balloons. For freelance journalist Dan Owen the premise "riff[s] on the fact [that] online auction sites like eBay often sell ludicrous items for huge amounts of money". Owen argued that the episode's plot offers an amusing way that such a sale could come about. Though not fraudulent, the sale would nonetheless be "highly disrespectful and money-grabbing".

Reception

Gerard Gilbert of The Independent, Jack Seale of Radio Times, Dessau and Owen all stressed that "Last Gasp" was weaker than the three previous episodes of Inside No.9. Seale claimed that there were "several sublime moments – but no knockout blow", while Dessau wrote that "it doesn't really go anywhere and it resolves itself a little too simplistically", and Owen felt that the episode "didn't manage to go anywhere very unexpected... and just sort of ended". All three suggested, however, that the episode still had its strengths; for Seale, it was as "brilliantly acted and constructed as you'd expect", Dessau considered it watchable, and Owen felt it was enjoyable to watch with a number of funny moments. Shennan, writing for the Liverpool Echo, wrote that "perhaps there had to be a dud – or, at least, disappointing – episode sooner or later", noting that you "can't win 'em all".

The acting in the episode was praised by Michael Hogan and Rachel Ward, who wrote in The Daily Telegraph that "with their gift for comedy, vulnerability and pathos, Tamsin Grieg and Sophie Thompson... deliver excellent performances". Similarly, Owen wrote that "the performances were good—especially from Thompson as the mousy housewife, and I liked the sour expressions from child star Hutchinson". Nonetheless, he thought it regrettable than a real-world musician had not been cast, especially as he considered it unlikely that Tamsin would admire Parsons. Awarding the episode three and a half out of five, he thought "the set-up... sublime, the central dilemma amusing, and the execution typically brilliant". In the review published in The Star, "Last Gasp" was described as "hilarious". The title, it was suggested, is appropriate, "as I caught myself gasping more than once as its foul contents unfolded". Upton called the episode "a clever little piece".

On the day it was shown, "Last Gasp" was selected as comedy "pick of the day" in the Daily Express, but, the following day, an extremely critical review of the episode by Virginia Blackburn was published in the newspaper. She felt that the episode was disappointing and wasted the talent of the actors, and that the concept was "the sort of idea you can imagine two students coming up with after the sixth pint... and then feeling slightly embarrassed about it when they wake up the next morning". She summed up the episode by saying that it was neither funny nor clever, and "is so utterly, irredeemably, naffly silly that it ends up being incredibly irritating and nothing else".

An interview with Shearsmith and Pemberton was published on British comedy website Chortle.co.uk after Inside No.9 won the Chortle Award for best TV show. The pair were asked if they would ever consider writing an episode with a happy ending. Shearsmith responded by saying "Yes, because that would be the biggest surprise of all... But last year we had the Last Gasp, and that had quite a happy ending - and people hated that one!" Similarly, Pemberton suggested that "people are disappointed if we don't deliver something horrible".

Viewing figures
Based on overnight viewing figures, "Last Gasp" drew a lower viewership than any previous episode of Inside No.9, with 872,000 viewers. In most UK listings, it was preceded by Line of Duty, which drew 2.2 million viewers (9.7% of the audience). However, the following episode of Inside No.9, "The Understudy", drew a lower number of viewers still, with 720,000 viewers. The final episode of the first series, "The Harrowing", saw an increase in viewing figures, leaving "Last Gasp" with the second-lowest viewership of the series, below the series average of 904,000 people, and the slot average of 970,000 people.

Charity auction
Pemberton listed a balloon containing his breath which had appeared on "Last Gasp" on eBay. Listed with the balloon was a copy of the episode's poster signed by Pemberton and Shearsmith. The auction was held to raise money for Give It Up, a Sport Relief charity founded by comedian Russell Brand to help those recovering from alcoholism and drug addiction. The winning bid on the auction was for £265.00.

Notes

References

External links

"Last Gasp on the British Comedy Guide

2014 British television episodes
Inside No. 9 episodes
Television episodes about murder
Television episodes about death
Works about singers
Television episodes about birthdays
Cultural depictions of pop musicians